The Eparchy of St. Thomas Syro-Malabar Catholic of Chicago, also known as the St. Thomas Syro-Malabar Diocese of Chicago, is a Syro-Malabar Catholic Church ecclesiastical territory or eparchy of the Catholic Church in the United States. Its episcopal seat is the Mar Thoma Sleeha Cathedral in the episcopal see of Chicago in Illinois state. 

The Most Reverend Mar Joy Alappat is the current bishop of the Eparchy since October 2022. While Mar Jacob Angadiath served as the bishop since the Eparchy's establishment in 2001 until his retirement in July 2022. It is not part of any ecclesiastical province, but immediately subject to the Holy See and depends on the Dicastery for the Oriental Churches.

The eparchy was erected by Pope John Paul II on 13 March 2001. It is one of the four eparchies of the Syro-Malabar Church outside India. In fact the Chicago Eparchy is the first ecclesiastical territory of the Syro-Malabar Church outside India. It has jurisdiction over all Syro-Malabar Catholics in the United States, including Knanaya Catholics in the US.

History

Under the Latin Dioceses 

Syro-Malabar Catholics began to migrate en masse to the United States in the 1950s. Their number increased in the following decades. Since the Syro-Malabar Church had no ecclesiastical jurisdiction in the United States, the Syro-Malabar migrants became members of the local Latin Church parishes.

The Syro-Malabar Catholics in the United States wished to have liturgical services in their own rite. They organized in the major cities as Catholic lay associations and organized Holy Qurbana and retreats with bi-ritual Syro-Malabar priests (serving at Latin parishes) who were locally available. The local Latin dioceses supported them by establishing Syro-Malabar missions under their dioceses.

Studies on the Syro-Malabar faithful 
Because the number of Syro-Malabar faithful settling outside Kerala and India increased, Pope John Paul II appointed Antony Padiyara on 8 September 1978 as Apostolic Visitor to study the pastoral needs of the Syro-Malabar faithful living outside the proper territory of the Syro-Malabar Church.

Bishop of Rajkot Gregory Karotemprel, the chair of the Commission for the pastoral care for the migrants and apostolic visitator to USA and Canada, made an extensive study of the pastoral concerns of the Syro-Malabar immigrants in the United States and Canada by visiting the major cities in 1996. He recommended to the Holy See to establish Syro-Malabar diocese for the faithful living in the United States and Canada.

Varkey Vithayathil made a follow up study in 1998 by visiting major cities in the United States and Canada. He also recommended to Rome the relevance of a Syro-Malabar eparchy in the United States.

Establishment of the Eparchy 
Based on the above reports and considering the need of preserving the liturgical tradition of the Syro-Malabar faithful, Pope John Paul II established the St. Thomas Syro-Malabar Catholic Diocese of Chicago on 13 March 2001 with pastoral jurisdiction over all the Syro-Malabar faithful in the United States and appointed Fr. Jacob Angadiath as its first bishop. Bishop Jacob was also appointed as the Apostolic Visitator to Canada. Jacob Angadiath was the director of Mar Thoma Sleeha Mission in Chicago when he was selected as the bishop. Previously he was the vicar of St. Thomas the Apostle Catholic Church in Garland, TX that he had established in 1992.

Bishop of Pala Joseph Pallikaparampil, who was in charge of the Overseas Mission of the Syro-Malabar Church, had sent him to Dallas in 1984 to serve the Syro-Malabar faithful in that region. He was the first Syro-Malabar priest officially appointed to begin a Syro-Malabar ministry in the US.

The inauguration of the diocese and the episcopal ordination of Jacob Angadiath was held in Chicago on 1 July 2001 at Hyatt Regency Hotel during the Second Syro-Malabar Convention. Varkey Vithayathil was the main celebrant of the consecration. Bishop of Pala Joseph Pallickaparampil and Bishop of Kottayam Kuriakose Kunnacherry were co-consecrators. Archbishop of Chicago Francis Cardinal George was the homilist during the ceremony.

Bishop Jacob Angadiath appointed Fr. George Madathilparambil as proto-syncellus and Fr. Abraham Mutholath as syncellus (Vicar Generals) of the diocese on 3 October 2001. The other first curia members were Fr. Zacharias Thottuvelil (Chancellor & Secretary), and Fr. Antony Thundathil (Finance Officer and Cathedral Vicar).

Priests and liturgy 
The Eparchy of St. Thomas of Chicago depends on Syro-Malabar priests from Kerala, India; priests would come from the archeparchies and eparchies of Ernakulam-Angamaly (Idukki, Kothamangalam), Changanassery (Kanjirappally, Palai), Thalasshery (Mananthavady, Thamarassery), Thrissur (Irinjalakuda, Palaghat), and Kottayam (Knanaya). The Syro-Malabar liturgy was primarily in Syriac prior to the Second Vatican Council. Post-Second Vatican Council, the liturgy was translated to Indian languages Malayalam, Hindi, and Tamil as the Syro-Malabar Church was mainly based in India. Bishop Jacob Angadiath commissioned on behalf of the Synod of the Syro-Malabar Church, Joseph J. Palackal and George Thaila to set the English language Qurbana text to music in 2007.

The American-born Roy Joseph  was ordained in 2016 in the Latin Church as a Jesuit priest, although he is a bi-ritual priest in both the Latin and Syro-Malabar rites. On May 5, 2018, Kevin Mundackal of Thornwood, New York, was ordained as the first ever American-born Syro-Malabar priest at St. Thomas Syro Malabar Forane Catholic Church, Somerset, NJ. Shortly after on June 2, 2018, Rajeev Valiyaveettil Philip of Tampa, Florida, was also ordained to the priesthood. Melvin Mangalath Paul was ordained to the priesthood on 16 May 2020 at the Mar Thoma Sleeha Cathedral in Chicago. Deacon Thomas "Timmy" Pulickal was ordained on 6 June 2020 for ministry with the eparchy and the Jesus Youth movement. Deacon Joby Joseph was ordained on 22 May 2021 at the Saint Alphonsa Syro-Malabar Catholic Church in San Fernando, CA as the fifth overall priestly ordination for the eparchy.

Bishops 
The Bishop has the pastoral governance of the eparchy. Jacob Angadiath was appointed as the first bishop of the new eparchy in 2001. He served in the role for 21 years until his retirement in 2022. The Pope Named the Auxiliary Bishop of the Eparchy, Joy Alappat as the Bishop-elect on July 3, 2022 (Feast of Durkanna), who was installed on October 1, 2022.

List of Bishops 

 Jacob Angadiath (2001-2022) 
 Joy Alappat (2022–present)

Auxiliary Bishops 
The Auxiliary Bishop has the role of assisting the Bishop in leading the eparchy and representing him if needed. Mar Thoma Sleeha Cathedral Rector and Vicar General of the Diocese Joy Alappat was selected by Pope Francis as the first Auxiliary Bishop of the Diocese on July 24, 2022. The position became vacant when Alappat was appointed as Bishop of the Eparchy.

List of Auxilary Bishops 

 Joy Alappat (2014-2022)

Parishes and missions
The eparchy's cathedral is in Bellwood, Illinois. The Mar Thoma Shleeha Cathedral is a parish church with almost 1000 families and is seat to the bishop. The cathedral was dedicated on July 5, 2008.

, there were an estimated 87,600 Syro-Malabar Catholics in the United States.  Some of the parishes and missions are dedicated to the pastoral care of faithful of the Knanaya Catholics, under the pastoral guidance of Knanaya priests. The eparchy includes 42 parishes and 32 missions. Congregations are located in the following states and provinces:

See also 
Syro-Malabar Catholic Church
List of the Catholic bishops of the United States#Other Eastern Catholic bishops
List of the Catholic dioceses of the United States

References

Bibliography 

 Diocesan Directory 2013-14, St. Thomas Syro-Malabar Diocese of Chicago, 2014.
 Diocesan Directory 2016, St. Thomas Syro-Malabar Diocese of Chicago, 2016.
 Diocesan Bulletin, St. Thomas Syro-Malabar Diocese, 2001 October onwards.
 Enas, Dr. Enas A, An Eyewitness Account of The Syromalabar Story of Chicago Metropolis, Chicago: 2018.
 Kottukappally, George Joseph (Editor in chief), Commemorative Souvenir - 2001, Syro-Malabar Catholic Convention, Inauguration of the St. Thomas Diocese of Chicago, Episcopal Ordination of Mar Jacob Angadiath, Chicago: Mar Thomas Sleeha Cathedral, 2001.
 The Episcopal Ordination of Mar Joy Alappat, Chicago: St. Thomas Syro-Malabar Catholic Diocese of Chicago, 2014.

External links
Syro-Malabar Catholic Eparchy of St. Thomas of Chicago Official Site
Mar Thoma Sleeha Cathedral
Syro-Malabar Church
Knanaya Region
Homily Resources

Asian-American culture in Chicago
Indian-American culture in Illinois
Eastern Catholicism in Illinois
Saint Thomas Syro
Saint Thomas Syro
Chicago
Christianity in Chicago
Saint Thomas Syro
2001 establishments in Illinois
Buildings and structures in Cook County, Illinois